Arup Kumar Baidya (born 7 September 1987) is a Bangladeshi footballer who plays as a left back and can also be deployed as a left midfielder. He last played for and captained Brothers Union  in the Bangladesh Premier League and is a former player for the Bangladesh national football team.

International goals

Bangladesh national team

Honours
Sheikh Russel KC
 Bangabandhu Gold Cup: 2017

References

Living people
1987 births
Bangladesh Football Premier League players
Bangladeshi footballers
Bangladesh international footballers
Association football defenders
Bangladeshi Hindus
Abahani Limited (Dhaka) players
Muktijoddha Sangsad KC players
Sheikh Russel KC players
Mohammedan SC (Dhaka) players
Brothers Union players
Sheikh Jamal Dhanmondi Club players